Joey Faye's Frolics is an American comedy/variety show that aired on CBS Wednesday night from 9:30 to 10:00 pm Eastern time for two weeks from April 5, 1950 to April 12, 1950.

Regulars
Joey Faye
Audrey Christie
Mandy Kaye
Danny Dayton
Joe Silver

References

1950 American television series debuts
1950 American television series endings
1950s American variety television series
CBS original programming